

Results 
Scores and results list Australia's points tally first.

Sources

Australia
Australia national rugby union team tours of New Zealand
tour
tour